Macarostola ageta is a moth of the family Gracillariidae. It is known from Queensland, Australia.

References

Macarostola
Moths described in 1917